Austin Reiter (born November 27, 1991) is an American football center for the Kansas City Chiefs of the National Football League (NFL). He was selected by the Washington Redskins in the seventh round of the 2015 NFL Draft. He played high school football at Lakewood Ranch in Florida and college football at South Florida.

Professional career

Washington Redskins
With their last pick in the 2015 NFL Draft, the Washington Redskins selected Reiter in the seventh round with the 222nd overall pick. He signed a four-year contract with the team on May 8, 2015. He was waived on September 4 before the start of the regular season, but signed to the practice squad on September 29.

He signed a futures contract on January 11, 2016. He was released by the Redskins on September 13, 2016. He was re-signed to the teams' practice squad the next day.

Cleveland Browns
On September 20, 2016, Reiter signed with the Cleveland Browns' active roster. On October 2, he started his first game for the Browns but suffered a season-ending ACL tear during the contest. He was placed on injured reserve on October 10, 2016.

Reiter was waived by the Browns on September 2, 2018.

Kansas City Chiefs
On September 3, 2018, Reiter was claimed off waivers by the Kansas City Chiefs. He signed a two-year contract extension with the Chiefs on December 6, 2018.

In 2019, Reiter was named the Chiefs starting center and started every game including the playoffs. He won Super Bowl LIV when the Chiefs defeated the San Francisco 49ers 31–20.

New Orleans Saints
On September 15, 2021, Reiter was signed to the New Orleans Saints practice squad. On September 18, 2021, Reiter was promoted to the New Orleans Saints active roster for the game against the Carolina Panthers.

Miami Dolphins
On October 5, 2021, Reiter was signed by the Miami Dolphins off the Saints' practice squad. He started five games at center due to injury before being released on December 14.

Los Angeles Rams
On December 18, 2021, Reiter was signed to the Los Angeles Rams practice squad, but was released three days later.

Kansas City Chiefs (second stint)
Reiter signed with the Kansas City Chiefs on March 24, 2022. He was released on May 6, but re-signed four days later. He was released on August 30, 2022 and signed to the practice squad the next day. Reiter won his second Super Bowl ring when the Chiefs defeated the Philadelphia Eagles in Super Bowl LVII. He signed a reserve/future contract on February 15, 2023.

References

External links 
 Kansas City Chiefs bio
 Washington Redskins bio
 USF Bulls bio

1991 births
Living people
American football offensive linemen
Cleveland Browns players
Kansas City Chiefs players
Miami Dolphins players
Los Angeles Rams players
New Orleans Saints players
Players of American football from Florida
South Florida Bulls football players
Sportspeople from Bradenton, Florida
Washington Redskins players
Ed Block Courage Award recipients